Mollie Grace O'Callaghan,  (born 2 April 2004) is an Australian swimmer. She competed in the 2020 Summer Olympics. O'Callaghan swam on the first night of racing in the heats of the women's  freestyle. She ended up winning 2 gold medals and a bronze medal, all from heat swims. She attends St. Peter’s Western swim club.

2020 Tokyo Olympics
O'Callaghan swam for the Australian team in the preliminaries of all three women's relays at the 2020 Summer Olympics in Tokyo, receiving two gold medals and one bronze for her contribution. Swimming the 1st leg for Australia in the heats of the 4 × 100 metre freestyle relay, she posted a time of 53.08 and received a gold medal after the Australian team won the final.

In the 4 × 200 metre freestyle relay preliminaries, O'Callaghan swam a 
junior world record of 1:55.11 when swimming the lead off leg. Her time would have placed her fifth in the 
200 metre freestyle final. However, because the Australian coaches had previously decided to use four fresh swimmers in the final, O'Callaghan was controversially not selected for the final where Australia finished third.

In a heat of the 4 × 100 metre medley relay, O'Callaghan again posted 
a competitive time; her anchor leg split was 52.35, only 0.24 seconds slower than the fastest freestyle split in the final by Cate Campbell.

Results in major championships

World records

Long course metres

 split 52.03 (4th leg); with Jack Cartwright (1st leg), Kyle Chalmers (2nd leg), Madison Wilson (3rd leg)
 split 1:54.80 (3rd leg); with Madison Wilson (1st leg), Kiah Melverton (2nd leg), Ariarne Titmus (4th leg)

Short course metres

 split 52.19 (1st leg); with Madison Wilson (2nd leg), Meg Harris (3rd leg), Emma McKeon (4th leg)
 split 1:52.83 (2nd leg), with Madison Wilson (1st leg), Leah Neale (3rd leg), Lani Pallister (4th leg)
 split 25.49 (backstroke leg); with Chelsea Hodges (breaststroke leg), Emma McKeon (butterfly leg), Madison Wilson (freestyle leg)

Honours
 In the 2022 Australia Day Honours, O'Callaghan was awarded the Medal of the Order of Australia.
 Swimming Australia, Olympic Program Swimmer of the Year: 2022

See also
 List of Olympic medalists in swimming (women)
 List of multiple Olympic gold medalists at a single Games
 List of junior world records in swimming

References

External links
 
 
 
 
 

2004 births
Living people
Recipients of the Medal of the Order of Australia
Swimmers at the 2020 Summer Olympics
Medalists at the 2020 Summer Olympics
Australian female freestyle swimmers
Olympic swimmers of Australia
Olympic gold medalists for Australia
Olympic bronze medalists for Australia
Olympic gold medalists in swimming
Olympic bronze medalists in swimming
Sportswomen from Queensland
World Aquatics Championships medalists in swimming
Medalists at the FINA World Swimming Championships (25 m)
21st-century Australian women
Swimmers at the 2022 Commonwealth Games
Commonwealth Games medallists in swimming
Commonwealth Games gold medallists for Australia
Commonwealth Games silver medallists for Australia
Medallists at the 2022 Commonwealth Games